Birch Creek flows into Esopus Creek in Big Indian. Most of Belleayre Ski Resort is located within Birch Creek’s watershed, and therefore the runoff from the ski resorts snowpack drains into Birch Creek via Cathedral Brook.

Hydrology

Discharge
The United States Geological Survey (USGS) has maintained a stream gauge along Birch Creek since October 1998.

References

Rivers of New York (state)
Rivers of Ulster County, New York
Rivers of Greene County, New York
Tributaries of the Hudson River